The 1920 Australasian Championships was a tennis tournament that took place on outdoor Grass courts at the Adelaide Oval, Adelaide, Australia from 15 March to 20 March. It was the 13th edition of the Australian Championships (now known as the Australian Open), the 2nd held in Adelaide, and the first Grand Slam tournament of the season. The singles titles was won by Australian Pat O'Hara Wood.

Finals

Singles

 Pat O'Hara Wood defeated  Ronald Thomas  6–3, 4–6, 6–8, 6–1, 6–3

Doubles
 Pat O'Hara Wood /  Ronald Thomas defeated  Horace Rice /  Roy Taylor 6–1, 6–0, 7–5

References

External links
 Australian Open official website

 
1920 in Australian tennis
1920
March 1920 sports events